Jonathan L. Howard is a British writer and game designer, known mainly for his novels about Johannes Cabal the Necromancer. He lives with his wife and daughter near Bristol.

Work
Howard worked as scriptwriter and video game writer since the early 1990s, and wrote the Broken Sword series of games among others. He came to readers' attention with his series of black comedy novels about the necromancer Johannes Cabal.

Other works include the Russalka Chronicles, a series of young adult submarine warfare science fiction novels. Set on the ocean planet Russalka, named after the mythical mermaid by its Russian colonists, they follow young civilian submariner Katya Kuriakova as she lives through a time of increasing conflict between the colonists' two main factions and the remnants of a failed Terran invasion. The first novel, Katya's World (2012) was well received by critics, with Publishers Weekly noting its "strong cast and a believable sense of danger", and io9 highlighting that, unusually for young-adult fiction, the novel featured a broad cast of competent adult supporting characters and refrained from giving the protagonist a romantic interest.

Bibliography
The Johannes Cabal series
Novels:
Johannes Cabal the Necromancer, 2009
Johannes Cabal the Detective, 2010
Johannes Cabal: The Fear Institute, 2011
The Brothers Cabal, 2014
Johannes Cabal and the Blustery Day: And Other Tales of the Necromancer, 2015 (collection)
The Fall of The House of Cabal, 2016
Short fiction (included in the 2015 collection):
"Johannes Cabal and the Blustery Day," 2004
"Exeunt Demon King," 2006
"The Ereshkigal Working," 2011
"The House of Gears," 2011
"The Death of Me," 2013
"Ouroboros Ouzo", 2014
"A Long Spoon", 2014

The Russalka Chronicles novels
Katya's World, 2012
Katya's War, 2013

Carter & Lovecraft Series
Carter & Lovecraft, 2015
After the End of the World, 2017

Short Story Collections
Kyth the Taker, 2017

References

External links

Writers from Bristol
Living people
Year of birth missing (living people)